This article lists players who have recently captained the Clare county hurling team in the All-Ireland Senior Hurling Championship. Unlike other counties the captain is not chosen from the club that has won the Clare Senior Hurling Championship.

List of captains

+Captains
Hurlers
Clare